Speed limits in the Isle of Man are measured in miles per hour, and the same basic design of road signs is used as in the United Kingdom.

As a self-governing British Crown Dependency outside the United Kingdom, the island's parliament is able to enact its own legislation, including road traffic laws such as speed limits and the ability to close roads to allow the Isle of Man TT to take place.

There is normally no national speed limit in the Isle of Man – some roads may be driven at any speed which is safe and appropriate. In built-up areas a speed limit of 30mph/50km/h usually applies. 

Careless and dangerous driving laws still apply, so one may not drive at absolutely any speed, and there are local speed limits on many roads. Many unrestricted roads have frequent bends which even the most experienced driver cannot see round.

Set against this is a strong culture of motor sport enthusiasm; many residents familiar with the roads are well used to traversing country roads at speeds illegal on similar roads elsewhere. This leads to a very diverse spread of both driving competence and speed. In an official survey in 2006, the introduction of blanket speed limits was refused by the population.

Due to the COVID-19 pandemic, an island-wide temporary speed limit of 40mph/60km/h was introduced in 2020, later increasing to 60mph/100 km/h.

See also
Speed limits in the United Kingdom

References

External links
Speed restrictions - Isle of Man Constabulary website
BBC News, 27 March 2020 - introduction of temporary 40 m.p.h. speed limit

Isle of Man